Alexander C. Bishop was an American politician who served as the Attorney General of Utah from 1896 to 1901.

References

Utah Attorneys General
Utah Republicans